Jean-Claude Leclercq (born 22 July 1962 in Abbeville) is a French former professional road bicycle racer.

Major results

1984
 7th Overall Tour du Limousin
1st Stage 3
1985
 1st  Road race, National Road Championships
1986
 2nd Road race, National Road Championships
 2nd La Flèche Wallonne
 5th Overall Critérium du Dauphiné Libéré
 9th Overall Tour de Suisse
1st Stage 5
1987
 1st La Flèche Wallonne
 2nd Overall Tour de Romandie
 10th Liège–Bastogne–Liège
1988
 1st Stage 6 Tour de Suisse
1989
 6th Clásica de San Sebastián
1990
 Tirreno–Adriatico
1st Stages 3 & 6
 2nd Liège–Bastogne–Liège
 2nd La Flèche Wallonne
 2nd Milano–Torino
 3rd Overall Critérium International
 6th Amstel Gold Race
1991
 1st Chur-Arosa
 1st Prologue Tour de Suisse
 1st Stage 1 Tour de Romandie
 1st Stage 1 Critérium International
1992
 1st Stage 4 Critérium du Dauphiné Libéré

External links 

French male cyclists
1962 births
Living people
Sportspeople from Abbeville
Tour de Suisse stage winners
Cyclists from Hauts-de-France